Super Methane Brothers is a video game similar to Taito's Bubble Bobble arcade game, released for Amiga in 1993 by Apache Software. Contemporary reviewers compared it to Namco's Tumblepop.

Gameplay 
The protagonists of the game, Puff and Blow, each have a Methane Gas Gun which fires a cloud of immobilising gas. If this comes into contact with a bad guy, he will be absorbed into the gas and then float around the screen for a limited time. Bad guys are harmless in this state. Puff and Blow must suck the floating gas clouds into their guns and blast them out against a vertical surface. Bad guys then turn into bonuses which can be collected.

Reception and legacy 
Super Methane Bros was received mixed with 72% in Amiga Power issue 39 from July 1994.

With permission from Apache Software Ltd a modern port under GPLv2 with the original assets was released in 2001 by Mark Page. This game has ports for Microsoft Windows, Linux and RISC OS. The source code and project is hosted on SourceForge, latest update was in 2021.

In 2009 an iOS version was released by Mobila Interactive, LLC.

Between 2005 and May 2017 Super Methane Bros. was downloaded from SourceForge alone over 48,000 times.

External links 
 Super Methane Bros. ports at sourceforge.net
 Super Methane Bros. at Lemon Amiga

References 

Amiga games
Amiga CD32 games
Platform games
1993 video games
Windows games
Linux games
Acorn Archimedes games
Open-source video games
Video game clones
Video games developed in the United Kingdom